Prohibido Amar (Forbidden Love, Official release: Forbidden Passion) is a Mexican telenovela produced by Azteca in 2013. It is a remake of Colombian telenovela, La Sombra del Deseo. Soundtrack principal de la telenovela interpretado por Myriam Montemayor.  On 7 October 2013, Azteca started broadcasting Prohibido Amar weeknights at 8:30pm, replacing Secretos de Familia. The last episode was broadcast on 7 February 2014, with Siempre Tuya Acapulco replacing it the following week.

Cast

References

2013 telenovelas
2013 Mexican television series debuts
2014 Mexican television series endings
Mexican telenovelas
TV Azteca telenovelas
Mexican television series based on Colombian television series
Spanish-language telenovelas